Óscar Emilio McFarlane Ortega (born 29 November 1980) is a Panamanian football goalkeeper for the San Francisco of the LPF.

Club career
Nicknamed La Bruja, McFarlane played for several local clubs before embarking on a lengthy spell at Tauro. He moved abroad to play for Peruvian side CNI in December 2008 from Sporting San Miguelito and in June 2014 he joined Costa Rican side Pérez Zeledón. He returned to Panama in March 2015 to play for San Francisco but regulations of the LPF delayed his debut for the club since his license was not released in time by Pérez Zeledón.

International career
He has been a member of all the youth processes of the Panama national team.

McFarlane made his senior debut for Panama in an April 2001 friendly match against Haiti and has, as of 10 June 2015, earned a total of 26 caps, scoring no goals. He represented his country at the 2007 UNCAF Nations Cup.

On May 31, 2014, after a 5-year absence from the national football team, he started at goalkeeper in the 1–1 tie against Serbia.

Murder allegations and jail
In March 2011, McFarlane was jailed and accused for shooting a man during a fight in San Miguelito. Three years earlier, he had been arrested once for illegal possession of weapons. In November 2012, he was declared innocent by the Second Superior Court after spending 20 months in the El Renacer jail.

Honors
Club
ANAPROF (3): 2001, 2003, 2007 (A)
 
National team
Gold Cup Runner-Up (1): 2005
UNCAF Nations Cup Runner-Up (1): 2007

Individual 
Chosen three times as best goalkeeper of ANAPROF (2001, 2003, 2006)
Chosen best player of ANAPROF in 2006

References

External links
McFarlane profile

McFarlane debut information

1980 births
Living people
Sportspeople from Panama City
Association football goalkeepers
Panamanian footballers
C.D. Plaza Amador players
Panamá Viejo players
Tauro F.C. players
Sporting San Miguelito players
Colegio Nacional Iquitos footballers
Unión Deportivo Universitario players
Municipal Pérez Zeledón footballers
San Francisco F.C. players
Panama international footballers
2005 CONCACAF Gold Cup players
2007 UNCAF Nations Cup players
2007 CONCACAF Gold Cup players
2009 CONCACAF Gold Cup players
2014 Copa Centroamericana players
Panamanian expatriate footballers
Expatriate footballers in Peru
Expatriate footballers in Costa Rica